Meadowbrook is an unincorporated community in Montgomery County, Pennsylvania. It is located within Abington Township.

Administration
The community is served by Abington Police, and the majority of Meadowbrook is represented at the township level by Abington Ward 1 Commissioner Steven Kline. Rydal-Meadowbrook Civic Association serves neighbors in this community by hosting candidate forums and advocating for public safety and property rights of homeowners.

Transport
Meadowbrook Station along SEPTA Regional Rail's West Trenton Line served the village. According to histories maintained by the Old York Road Historical Society, this station was previously called Paul Brook Station in the early days.

Popular culture
Meadowbrook and a sort of street gang named "Meadowbrook Mafia" was cited in an episode ("Just Say No", 2x20) of The Goldbergs, a television series set in the nearby Jenkintown.

Notable people
 Steve Frey, former pitcher for five teams over eight major league seasons, including Montreal Expos.
 Gregg Murphy, sports journalist who has been a broadcaster for the Philadelphia Phillies.

References

Unincorporated communities in Montgomery County, Pennsylvania
Unincorporated communities in Pennsylvania